Chandongja Park is a multi-use stadium in Chongjin, North Korea.  It is currently used mostly for football matches and hosts the home matches of Ch'ŏngjin Chandongcha. The stadium holds 15,000 people.

See also 

 List of football stadiums in North Korea

References 

Sports venues in North Korea
Football venues in North Korea
Chongjin
Buildings and structures in North Hamgyong Province